Charles Quatermaine (30 December 1877 in Richmond, Surrey – August 1958 in Sussex) was a British stage and film actor. He also appeared on Broadway. He was the second husband of actress Mary Forbes, and brother of Leon Quartermaine.

Filmography

References

External links

1877 births
1958 deaths
English male film actors
English male silent film actors
People from Richmond, London
20th-century English male actors
British expatriate male actors in the United States